ATP synthase F1 subunit alpha, mitochondrial is an enzyme that in humans is encoded by the ATP5F1A gene.

Function 

This gene encodes a subunit of mitochondrial ATP synthase. Mitochondrial ATP synthase catalyzes ATP synthesis, using an electrochemical gradient of protons across the inner membrane during oxidative phosphorylation. ATP synthase is composed of two linked multi-subunit complexes: the soluble catalytic core, F1, and the membrane-spanning component, Fo, comprising the proton channel. The catalytic portion of mitochondrial ATP synthase consists of 5 different subunits (alpha, beta, gamma, delta, and epsilon) assembled with a stoichiometry of 3 alpha, 3 beta, and a single representative of the other 3. The proton channel consists of three main subunits (a, b, c). This gene encodes the alpha subunit of the catalytic core. Alternatively spliced transcript variants encoding the same protein have been identified. Pseudogenes of this gene are located on chromosomes 9, 2, and 16.

Structure
The ATP5F1A gene, located on the q arm of chromosome 18 in position 21, is made up of 13 exons and is 20,090 base pairs in length. The ATP5F1A protein weighs 59.7 kDa and is composed of 553 amino acids. The protein is a subunit of the catalytic portion of the F1Fo ATPase, also known as Complex V, which consists of 14 nuclear and 2 mitochondrial -encoded subunits. As an alpha subunit, ATP5F1A is contained within the catalytic F1 portion of the complex. The nomenclature of the enzyme has a long history. The F1 fraction derives its name from the term "Fraction 1" and Fo (written as a subscript letter "o", not "zero") derives its name from being the binding fraction for oligomycin, a type of naturally-derived antibiotic that is able to inhibit the Fo unit of ATP synthase. The F1 particle is large and can be seen in the transmission electron microscope by negative staining. These are particles of 9 nm diameter that pepper the inner mitochondrial membrane. They were originally called elementary particles and were thought to contain the entire respiratory apparatus of the mitochondrion, but, through a long series of experiments, Efraim Racker and his colleagues (who first isolated the F1 particle in 1961) were able to show that this particle is correlated with ATPase activity in uncoupled mitochondria and with the ATPase activity in submitochondrial particles created by exposing mitochondria to ultrasound. This ATPase activity was further associated with the creation of ATP by a long series of experiments in many laboratories.

Function 
Mitochondrial membrane ATP synthase (F1Fo ATP synthase or Complex V) produces ATP from ADP in the presence of a proton gradient across the membrane which is generated by electron transport complexes of the respiratory chain. F-type ATPases consist of two structural domains, F1 - containing the extramembraneous catalytic core, and Fo - containing the membrane proton channel, linked together by a central stalk and a peripheral stalk. During catalysis, ATP synthesis in the catalytic domain of F1 is coupled via a rotary mechanism of the central stalk subunits to proton translocation. Subunits alpha and beta form the catalytic core in F1. Rotation of the central stalk against the surrounding alpha(3)beta(3) subunits leads to hydrolysis of ATP in three separate catalytic sites on the beta subunits. Subunit alpha does not bear the catalytic high-affinity ATP-binding sites.

Clinical significance
Mutations affecting the ATP5F1A gene cause combined oxidative phosphorylation deficiency 22 (COXPD22), a mitochondrial disorder characterized by intrauterine growth retardation, microcephaly, hypotonia, pulmonary hypertension, failure to thrive, encephalopathy, and heart failure. Mutations on the ATP5F1A gene also cause mitochondrial complex V deficiency, nuclear 4 (MC5DN4), a mitochondrial disorder with heterogeneous clinical manifestations including dysmorphic features, psychomotor retardation, hypotonia, growth retardation, cardiomyopathy, enlarged liver, hypoplastic kidneys and elevated lactate levels in urine, plasma and cerebrospinal fluid.

Resveratrol inhibition of the F1 catalytic core increases adenosine monophosphate (AMP) levels, thereby activating the AMP-activated protein kinase enzyme.

Model organisms 

			
Model organisms have been used in the study of ATP5F1A function. A conditional knockout mouse line, called Atp5a1tm1a(EUCOMM)Wtsi was generated as part of the International Knockout Mouse Consortium program — a high-throughput mutagenesis project to generate and distribute animal models of disease to interested scientists.

Male and female animals underwent a standardized phenotypic screen to determine the effects of deletion. Twenty two tests were carried out on mutant mice and five significant abnormalities were observed. No homozygous mutant embryos were identified during gestation, and therefore none survived until weaning. The remaining tests were carried out on heterozygous mutant adult mice and decreased body weight, lean body mass and hypoproteinemia was observed in female animals.

References

Further reading

External links 
 
 

Genes mutated in mice